Quercus pubescens, the downy oak or pubescent oak, is a species of white oak (genus Quercus sect. Quercus) native to southern Europe and southwest Asia, from northern Spain (Pyrenees) east to the Crimea and the Caucasus. It is also found in France and parts of central Europe.

Description 

Forest-grown trees grow tall, while open-growing trees develop a very broad and irregular crown. Open-grown trees frequently develop several trunks. The bark is very rough, light gray and divided into small flakes. Large trees develop very thick whitish bark cracked into deep furrows, similar to the pedunculate oak but lighter in colour.

The twigs are light purple or whitish, with tomentum. The buds are small and blunt, light brown. The leaves group at the ends of twigs. The upper leaf surface is dark green and rough, the lower light green. Both leaf surfaces are covered with minute pubescence which is sometimes lost in older leaves by late summer. The young expanding leaves are whitish or pinkish with very soft tomentum. The leaf shape is very variable, divided into 3–7 pairs of deep or shallow lobes, which are usually divided into a few sublobes. The lobes are usually blunt, rarely sharp. The apex is usually wide and round. The base of the leaf is heart shaped, widely rounded or sometimes pointed. The petioles are 4–15 mm (rarely to 22 mm) long, stout and pubescent. The leaves are persistent late into the autumn, remaining green up to early winter. They eventually turn russet or brown and fall off.

The Quercus pubescens acorns are light brown to yellow, 8–20 mm long, usually thin and pointed. The acorn cups are light gray to almost white, with pointed, overlapping scales, covered with tomentum. The acorn stalks are thick and pubescent, up to 2 cm long. The acorns usually occur in groups of 2–5 on the same stalk.

Subspecies 
Three subspecies are accepted by Flora Europaea:
 Quercus pubescens subsp. pubescens – central and southern Europe.
 Quercus pubescens subsp. anatolica O.Schwarz – southwest Asia, southeast Europe.
 Quercus pubescens subsp. palensis (Palassou) O.Schwarz – northern Spain, Pyrenees.

Habitat 
Downy oaks typically grow in dry, lime-rich soils. It is a submediterranean species, growing from the coastline to deep in the continent. Its optimum is in the submediterranean region, characterized by hot dry summers and cool winters with little rainfall. In western and central Europe, downy oak is confined to areas with submediteranean microclimate (gorges, sandplains, steppe slopes) or to coastlines of former lakes.

References

 Flora Europaea: Quercus pubescens
 Bean, W. J. (1976). Trees and shrubs hardy in the British Isles 8th ed., revised. John Murray.
 Rushforth, K. (1999). Trees of Britain and Europe. HarperCollins .
  Chênes: Quercus pubescens
 Quercus pubescens and Quercus virgiliana - information, genetic conservation units and related resources. European Forest Genetic Resources Programme (EUFORGEN)

pubescens
Flora of Western Asia
Trees of Mediterranean climate
Trees of Europe
Plants described in 1796